Maksim Nikolayevich Mosin (born 16 February 1982) is a former Russian professional football player.

Club career
He played in the Russian Football National League for FC Metallurg Lipetsk in 2004.

External links
 

1982 births
Living people
Russian footballers
Association football forwards
FC Metallurg Lipetsk players
FC Zenit-2 Saint Petersburg players
FC Dynamo Saint Petersburg players
FC Dynamo Vologda players
FC Sever Murmansk players